The BDX is a Belgian armored personnel carrier developed on the basis of the Irish designed Timoney armored vehicle.

Description
It is an amphibious vehicle. The hull of the vehicle is made of steel. It can carry up to 10 soldiers.

Vehicle armament may be varied, e.g. One or two pintle-mounted 7.62mm machine guns on the roof or a turret mounted 20 mm cannon. 13 vehicles intended for the Belgian Rijkswacht/Gendarmerie were  equipped with an 81mm mortar. Shooting takes place through the open roof hatch.

There is also the possibility of installing NBC protection system.

Users
 Belgium :
 Belgian Air Component - 63 vehicles
 Rijkswacht/Gendarmerie - 80 vehicles
 Argentina - 5 vehicles
 Mexico - 95 vehicles

External links
 Military-Today article

Armoured cars of the Cold War
Armoured personnel carriers of Belgium
Paramilitary vehicles
Wheeled amphibious armoured fighting vehicles
Military vehicles introduced in the 1970s
Wheeled armoured personnel carriers
Armoured personnel carriers of the Cold War